Sujit Chakravarty (born 13 February 1959) is an Indian association football manager.

Managing career
For the 2011–12 I-League season, Sujit was hired as assistant manager of Pailan Arrows but soon after the resignation of Sukhwinder Singh Sujit was hired to become caretaker of Pailan for the rest of the season.

Statistics

Manager

.

References

Living people
I-League managers
Pailan Arrows managers
Indian football managers
1959 births
Indian Arrows FC managers